Robert Kriech Ritner (April 5, 1953 – July 25, 2021) was an American Egyptologist most recently at the Oriental Institute of the University of Chicago.

Life

Education 
Ritner received his BA in psychology from Rice University in 1975, and  his Ph.D. (with honors) in Egyptology from the University of Chicago in 1987.  His dissertation was The Mechanics of Ancient Egyptian Magical Practice.

Teaching 
Between 1991 and 1996, Ritner held the position of Marilyn M. Simpson Assistant Professor of Egyptology in the Department of Near Eastern Languages and Civilizations at Yale University.  In 1996, he was recruited to the University of Chicago's Oriental Institute and Department of Near Eastern Languages and Civilizations.

Field of work 
Ritner was widely known for his work on Egyptian religious practices, language, medicine, literature, magic, and political history.  Within the Mormon studies community, Ritner was known for confirming the conclusions of other Egyptologists who have investigated the Joseph Smith papyri.  Ritner has concluded that the Book of Abraham is "a perhaps well-meaning, but erroneous invention by Joseph Smith."

He was a descendant of Joseph Ritner, who served as the Anti-Masonic Governor of Pennsylvania from 1835 to 1839, which Professor Ritner has noted with some amusement as he personally credits Freemasonry with helping to popularize ancient Egyptian culture and architecture.

Death 
Ritner died on 25 July 2021 at the age of 68.

Works 
Books

 
 
 
 
 
 
 

Chapters

 

Articles

References

Sources

 
 
 
 
 
 
 
 

Academic reviews of his works

 

  — a review of: "The 'Breathing Permit of Hôr' Thirty-four Years Later" and "'The Breathing Permit of Hôr' among the Joseph Smith Papyri"

External links
 Robert Ritner, Professor of Egyptology, Near Eastern Languages and Civilizations, Division of Humanities, University of Chicago

1953 births
2021 deaths
People from Houston
American Egyptologists
Rice University alumni
University of Chicago alumni
University of Chicago faculty
Yale University faculty
Book of Abraham